Douglas W. Prescott is a former American politician.

At the time of his first campaign for the New York State Assembly, Prescott chaired the Queens chapter of the Young Republicans. He defeated incumbent Vincent F. Nicolosi in the 25th district. Prescott lost to John F. Duane in 1982, and regained his seat in a 1984 rematch. With the endorsement of the New York State Right to Life Party and endorsement from The New York Times in 1986, Prescott retained his office against Democratic candidate Douglas S. MacKay. He won reelection in 1988 against Corey B. Bearak. In the 1990 general election, Prescott defeated James J. Wrynn. Prescott faced another incumbent, Morton C. Hillman of the 26th district in 1992, and won. He won another term as assemblyman from the 26th district against William A. Viscovich in 1994, then successively lost two subsequent elections, to Ann-Margaret Carrozza in 1996 and 1998.

References

Year of birth missing (living people)
Living people
20th-century American politicians
Republican Party members of the New York State Assembly
Politicians from Queens, New York
People from Bayside, Queens